Morerella is a genus of frogs belonging to the family Hyperoliidae.

The species of this genus are found in Western Central Africa.

Species
Species:
 Morerella cyanophthalma Rödel, Assemian, Kouamé, Tohé & Perret, 2009

References

Hyperoliidae
Amphibian genera